The Detroit Wolverines were a Major League Baseball team that was based in Detroit, Michigan and played in the National League from 1881 through 1888.  The Wolverines used four Opening Day starting pitchers in their eight years as a Major League Baseball franchise.  The first game of the new baseball season for a team is played on Opening Day, and being named the Opening Day starter is an honor that is often given to the player who is expected to lead the pitching staff that season, though there are various strategic reasons why a team's best pitcher might not start on Opening Day. The Wolverines had a record of four wins and four losses in their Opening Day games.

The first game in Detroit Wolverines history was played on May 2, 1881, against the Buffalo Bisons.  George Derby was the Opening Day starting pitcher in that game, which the Wolverines lost by a score of 6–5.  The Wolverines' last Opening Day game was played on April 20, 1888, against the Pittsburgh Alleghenys (now known as the Pittsburgh Pirates).  Charlie Getzien was the Wolverines' Opening Day starting pitcher in that game, which the Wolverines lost by a score of 5–2.  The Wolverines were the National League champions in 1887, and went on to win the 19th century version of the World Series by defeating the American Association (19th century) champion St. Louis Browns.  Lady Baldwin was the Wolverines' Opening Day starting pitcher that year, in a game the Wolverines won by a score of 4–3 against the Indianapolis Hoosiers.  Stump Wiedman made three Opening Day starts for the Wolverines, more than any other pitcher, in 1883, 1884 and 1885.  Derby and Baldwin each made two Opening Day starts.

Key

Pitchers

References

Opening Day starting pitchers
Lists of Major League Baseball Opening Day starting pitchers
Wolverines Opening Day starting pitchers
Michigan sports-related lists